1981 in philosophy

Events 
Gadamer–Derrida debate

Publications 
 Peter Singer, The Expanding Circle (1981)
 Alasdair MacIntyre, After Virtue (1981)
 Robert Nozick, Philosophical Explanations (1981)
 Jürgen Habermas, The Theory of Communicative Action (1981)
 Jean Baudrillard, Simulacra and Simulation (1981)

Births

Deaths 
 January 5 
 Lanza del Vasto, Italian-born philosopher, poet and activist (b. 1901)
 Frederick Osborn (born 1889)
 February 1 - Morris Weitz (born 1916)
 February 20 - Ioannis Theodorakopoulos (born 1900)
 February 26 - Wilmon Henry Sheldon (born 1875)
 March 8 - Joseph Henry Woodger (born 1894)
 March 28 - Tadeusz Czeżowski (born 1889)
 June 16 - Julius Ebbinghaus (born 1885)
 July 27 - Paul Brunton (born 1898)
 August 5 - Jerzy Neyman (born 1894)
 September 2 - Knud Ejler Løgstrup (born 1905)
 September 8 - Nisargadatta Maharaj (born 1897)
 September 9 - Jacques Lacan (born 1901)
 September 23 - Notonagoro (born 1905)
 September 24 - Brahmarishi Hussain Sha (born 1905)
 September 29 - Ksenija Atanasijević 
 October 3 - Tadeusz Kotarbiński (born 1886)
 October 7 - Huberto Rohden (born 1893)
 November 7 - Will Durant (born 1885)
 November 15 - Muhammad Husayn Tabatabaei (born 1903)
 December 2 - Alexis Kagame (born 1912)
 December 12 - J. L. Mackie (born 1917)
 Acharya Rameshwar Jha

References

Philosophy
20th-century philosophy
Philosophy by year